Rhodopina okinawensis is a species of beetle in the family Cerambycidae. It was described by Masaki Matsushita in 1933. It is known from Japan.

References

okinawensis
Beetles described in 1933